North Zone Cultural Centre or NZCC in Patiala in Punjab state was first amongst several regional cultural centres established by Government of India to preserve and promote arts, crafts, traditions and cultural heritage of India.

Establishment of North Zone Culture Centre was announced by then Prime Minister of India Rajiv Gandhi during his visit to Hussainiwala, Punjab on 23 March 1985.

The North Cultural Zone is one of seven Cultural Zones of India defined and provided with administrative infrastructure by the Government of India.

Other Regional Cultural Centres of India
 East Zone Cultural Centre, Kolkata
 North East Zone Cultural Centre, Chümoukedima, Nagaland 
 West Zone Cultural Centre Udaipur
 South Zone Cultural Centre, Tanjavur
South-Central Zone Cultural Centre, Nagpur, Maharashtra

References

External links
 Official Website of North Zone Cultural Centre

Punjab, India
Organisations based in Patiala
Cultural organisations based in India
North India
1986 establishments in Punjab, India
Cultural centres in India
Arts organizations established in 1986